Gã Mantse is the title of the Ghanaian king of the Gã State in southern part of Ghana, where the Ga-Adangbe people dwell with Accra as the capital city. The Ga-Dangbe, Gã-Daŋbɛ, Ga-Dangme, or GaDangme are an ethnic group in Ghana, Togo and Benin. The current king of the Ga State is  Nii Tackie Teiko Tsuru II, known in private life as Dr Kelvin Nii Tackie Abia, who was duly sworn in by the Ga Paramount Stool Dzasetse (Principal Kingmaker) Dr Nii Tetteh Kwei II , a host of Dzasefoi (Kingmakers) and other traditional leaders as per Custom and Tradition demands.

See also
 List of rulers of Gã

References

Akan

q